"Million Miles from Home" is a 1996 song by German band Dune, released on the group's second album, Expedicion (1996). It is sung by Verena von Strenge and peaked at number 10 in the Netherlands and number 17 in Germany. Additionally, it reached number 39 in Switzerland and number 40 in Sweden. On the Eurochart Hot 100, it peaked at number 61 in October 1996. A music video was produced to promote the single. It sees von Strenge alone on a planet in the outer space.

In popular culture
Drum and bass band Pendulum sampled "Million Miles from Home" in their song "Propane Nightmares".
It was also released on a CD celebrating the 30 year anniversary of Star Trek, Star Trek - 30 Years A Tribute.

Track listing
 12", Germany (1996)
"Million Miles from Home" (12" Mix) – 5:56
"Million Miles from Home" (B-Side Mix) – 5:36
"Million Miles from Home" (Vocoder Mix) – 4:36

 CD single, Germany (1996)
"Million Miles from Home" (Video Mix) – 3:58
"Million Miles from Home" (B-Side Mix) – 5:36

 CD maxi, Europe (1996)
"Million Miles from Home" (Video Mix) – 3:58
"Million Miles from Home" (12" Mix) – 5:56
"Million Miles from Home" (B-Side Mix) – 5:36
"Million Miles from Home" (Vocoder Mix) – 4:36

Charts

Weekly charts

Year-end charts

References

 

1996 singles
1996 songs
Dune (band) songs
English-language German songs
Songs written by Oliver Froning